The 5th Yerevan Golden Apricot International Film Festival was a film festival held in Yerevan, Armenia from 13–20 July 2008. The festival had more than 450 submissions from 67 countries; viewers had an opportunity to see over 160 films. Among the honorable guests of the festival were Wim Wenders, Enrica Antonioni, Goran Paskaljevic, Dariush Mehrjui, Catherine Breillat, and others. A Special Tribute was paid to Michelangelo Antonioni by honoring him with a posthumous Parajanov’s Thaler. Additionally, Wim Wenders and Dariush Mehrjui were honored with Parajanov’s Thaler Lifetime Achievement Awards. The main prizewinners of the 5th Golden Apricot were Anna Melikian from Russia for her film The Mermaid (Golden Apricot 2008 for the Best Feature Film), Meira Asher from Israel for the film Women See Lot of Things (Golden Apricot 2008 for the Best Documentary Film), and Eric Nazarian from the USA for The Blue Hour (Golden Apricot 2008 for the Best Film in the “Armenian Panorama”). The FIPRESCI Award went to Huseyn Karabey with his film My Marlon and Brando and the Ecumenical Award to Eric Nazarian with his film The Blue Hour.

About the Golden Apricot Yerevan International Film Festival 
The Golden Apricot Yerevan International Film Festival (GAIFF) is an annual film festival held in Yerevan, Armenia. The festival was founded in 2004 with the co-operation of the “Golden Apricot” Fund for Cinema Development, the Armenian Association of Film Critics and Cinema Journalists. The GAIFF is continually supported by the Ministry of Foreign Affairs of the RA, the Ministry of Culture of the RA and the Benevolent Fund for Cultural Development.The objectives of the festival are "to present new works by the film directors and producers in Armenia and foreign cinematographers of Armenian descent and to promote creativity and originality in the area of cinema and video art".

Awards GAIFF 2008

See also 
 Golden Apricot Yerevan International Film Festival
 Atom Egoyan
 Anna Melikyan
 Eric Nazarian
 Wim Wenders
 Michelangelo Antonioni
 Catherine Breillat
 Eran Riklis
 Aditya Assarat
 Cinema of Armenia
 2008 in film

References

Yerevan International Film Festival
21st century in Yerevan
2008 in Armenia
2008 film festivals
2008 festivals in Asia
2008 festivals in Europe